The Mountain Meadows massacre was a series of attacks on the Baker–Fancher emigrant wagon train, at Mountain Meadows in southern Utah. The attacks culminated on September 11, 1857 in the mass slaughter of the emigrant party by the Iron County district of the Utah Territorial Militia and some local Indians.

Initially intended to be an Indian massacre, two men with leadership roles in local military, church and government organizations, Isaac C. Haight and John D. Lee, conspired for Lee to lead militiamen disguised as Native Americans along with a contingent of Paiute tribesmen in an attack. The emigrants fought back and a siege ensued. Intending to leave no witnesses of Mormon complicity in the siege and avoid reprisals complicating the Utah War, militiamen induced the emigrants to surrender and give up their weapons. After escorting the emigrants out of their fortification, the militiamen and their tribesmen auxiliaries executed approximately 120 women, children, and men. Seventeen younger children were spared.

Investigations, temporarily interrupted by the American Civil War, resulted in nine indictments during 1874. Of the men indicted, only John D. Lee was tried in a court of law. After two trials Lee was convicted and executed near the massacre site.

First attack and siege 

During the early morning hours of Monday, September 7 the Baker–Fancher party was attacked by as many or more than 200 Paiutes and Mormon militiamen disguised as Native Americans.

The attackers were positioned in a small ravine south-east of the emigrant camp. As the attackers shot into the camp, the Baker–Fancher party defended itself by encircling and lowering their wagons, along with digging shallow trenches and throwing dirt both below and into the wagons. Seven emigrants were killed during the opening attack and were buried somewhere within the wagon encirclement; sixteen more were wounded. The attack continued for five days, during which the besieged families had little or no access to fresh water and their ammunition was depleted.

Massacre

On Friday, September 11 two Utah militiamen approached the Baker-Fancher party wagons with a white flag and were soon followed by Indian agent and militia officer John D. Lee. Lee told the battle-weary emigrants he had negotiated a truce with the Paiutes, whereby they could be escorted safely to Cedar City under Mormon protection in exchange for leaving all their livestock and supplies to the Native Americans.

Accepting this, they were split into three groups. Seventeen of the youngest children along with a few mothers and the wounded were put into wagons, which were followed by all the women and older children walking in a second group. Bringing up the rear were the adult males, each walking with an armed Utah militiaman at his right. Making their way back northeast towards Cedar City, the three groups gradually became strung out and visually separated by shrubs and a shallow hill. A few who escaped the initial slaughter were quickly chased down and killed. Two teen-aged girls, Rachel and Ruth Dunlap, managed to clamber down the side of a steep gully and hide among a clump of oak trees for several minutes. They were spotted by a Paiute chief from Parowan, who took them to Lee. Eighteen-year-old Ruth Dunlap reportedly fell to her knees and pleaded, "Spare me, and I will love you all my life!" (Lee denied this). 50 years later, a Mormon woman who was a child at the time of the massacre recalled hearing LDS women in St. George say both girls were raped before they were killed.

All of the Mormon participants in the massacre were then sworn to secrecy. The many dozens of bodies were hastily dragged into gullies and other low lying spots, then lightly covered with surrounding material which was soon blown away by the weather, leaving the remains to be scavenged and scattered by wildlife.

Surviving children
[[Image:Image-Nancy Sephrona Huff.jpg|thumb|right|200px|Survivor Nancy Sephrona Huff, four years old at tragedy, "was taken away by John Willis, whom she lived with until she was returned to relatives in Arkansas two years later."]]

Approximately seventeen children were deliberately spared because of their young ages. Multiple sources claim that Lee protested and prohibited the death of all children that were assumed to be too young to talk, and directed that they be placed in the care of one who was not involved in the massacre. Not all of the young children were spared, however; at least one infant was killed in his father's arms by the same bullet that killed the adult man. In the hours following the massacre Lee directed Philip Klingensmith and possibly two others to take the children (a few of whom were wounded) to the nearby farm of Jacob Hamblin, a local Indian agent. Later, under the direction of Jacob Forney, the non-Mormon Superintendent of Indian Affairs for Utah, the children were placed in the care of local Mormon families pending an investigation of the matter and notification of kin. However, some accounts relate that Lee sold or bartered the children to whatever Mormon families would take them. Sarah Francis Baker, who was three years old at the time of the massacre, later said: "They sold us from one family to another."

Aftermath and the distribution of spoil

The Paiutes received a portion of the Baker-Fancher party's significant livestock holdings as compensation for their part in the massacre. Many of the murdered emigrants' other belongings (including blood stained and bullet-riddled clothing stripped from the victims' corpses) were brought to Cedar City and stored in the cellar of the Cedar City LDS tithing office as "property taken at the siege of Sebastopol." There are conflicting accounts as to whether these items were auctioned off or simply taken by members of the local population. Some of the surviving children subsequently claimed to have seen Mormons wearing their dead parents' clothing and jewelry.

In 1859, two years after the massacre, Brevet Major James Henry Carleton arrived in the area "to bury the bones of the victims of that terrible massacre". "I saw several bones of what must have been very small children. Dr. Brewer says from what he saw he thinks some infants were butchered. The mothers doubtless had these in their arms, and the same shot or blow may have deprived both of life." "Hamblin himself showed Sergeant Fritz of my party a spot on the right-hand side of the road where had partially covered up a great many of the bones."

Carleton later said it was "a sight which can never be forgotten." After gathering up the skulls and bones of those who had died, Carleton's troops buried them and erected a rock cairn inscribed with the words, Here 120 men, women, and children were massacred in cold blood early in September, 1857. They were from Arkansas, along with a cross bearing the words, Vengeance is mine. I will repay, saith the Lord''. According to legend, on the Fourth anniversary of the massacre, Brigham Young himself came upon the monument and ordered it to be torn down. "Vengeance is mine" he said to have muttered "and I have taken a little".

Meanwhile, Forney and Governor Cummings directed Hamblin and Carleton to gather up the surviving children from local families and transport them to Salt Lake City, after which they were united with extended family members in Arkansas and other states. Several Mormon families claimed and received financial compensation from the federal government for the children's care and even protested that the amounts paid were insufficient although the conditions some of the children lived under were severely criticized.

Carleton issued a scathing report to the United States Congress, blaming local and senior church leaders for the massacre, however years later only Lee was charged with murder for his involvement. Lee's first trial ended in a mistrial but he was convicted on re-trial and executed by firing squad at Mountain Meadows.

The causes and circumstances of the Mountain Meadows Massacre remain contested and highly controversial. Although there is no evidence that Brigham Young ordered or condoned the massacre, the involvement of various church officials in both the murders and concealing evidence in their aftermath is still questioned. Moreover, while by all accounts Native American Paiutes were present, historical reports of their numbers and the details of their participation are contradictory.

See also
Investigations and prosecutions relating to the Mountain Meadows massacre

Notes

References

External links

Mountain Meadows Massacre